Maneuver (American English), manoeuvre (British English), manoeuver, manœuver (also spelled, directly from the French, as manœuvre) denotes one's tactical move, or series of moves, that improves or maintains one's strategic situation in a competitive environment or avoids a worse situation.

Military or naval  
 Military exercise
 Maneuver warfare
 Military tactics
 Military strategy

Controlled change in movement
 Aerobatic maneuver
 Orbital maneuver

Skilled movement or procedure
 Credé's maneuver
 Gowers's maneuver
 Heimlich maneuver, abdominal thrusts to relieve choking
 Kocher maneuver
 Leopold's maneuvers
 McRoberts maneuver
 Müller's maneuver
 Phalen's maneuver
 Pringle maneuver
 Sellick maneuver
 Valsalva's maneuver

Other
 Moose test